Refresh Bolivia is a student non profit community originating from Harvard University. The organisation is dedicated to constructing a "maternal and child care oriented community health center" in Cochabamba, Bolivia. Currently, international chapters of the organization exist at the University of Toronto, McMaster University, and Queen's University. According to the group, it has benefited "more than 2,000 people" by "constructing ecological bathrooms; teaching health workshops to men, women and children; and conducting research on the health needs of our target communities." Each January 20 students are recruited by the community to participate in a "two week-long service project."

References

Charity fundraisers
Student organizations
Harvard University